Fullers Crossroads is an unincorporated community in Crenshaw County, Alabama, United States.

History
Fullers Crossroads was most likely named for a local family. Fullers Crossroads was one of two choices for the first county seat of Crenshaw County, with Rutledge being chosen based on popular vote. The community maintains a volunteer fire department.

References

Unincorporated communities in Crenshaw County, Alabama
Unincorporated communities in Alabama